Judismo may refer to at least the following two languages:
 Judeo-Arabic
 Ladino language

See also 
 Judaeo-Romance languages
 Jewish languages
 Judaism